Interprovincial Cooperatives Ltd v R (1975), [1976] 1 SCR 477 (also called Interprovincial Co-Operatives Ltd. v. Dryden Chemicals Ltd.) is a leading decision of the Supreme Court of Canada on the constitutional limits of provincial powers.

Manitoba had enacted a law that granted individuals resident in the province who were harmed by river pollution originating from Saskatchewan and Ontario a right of action to sue the polluting companies based outside of the province.

Justice Ritchie, writing for the Court, held that such a statutory right of action was outside of their constitutional power to enact legislation related to property and civil rights within the province under section 92(16) of the Constitution Act, 1867. The pollutant companies were properly licensed by the provincial governments of Ontario and Saskatchewan and could not be disrupted  by Manitoba.

In a concurring reason by Justice Pigeon, he argued that the licence was not relevant but rather the fact that the polluting act occurred outside of Manitoba is enough to be outside the province's authority.

Chief Justice Laskin, in dissent, argued that the legislation was valid on the basis that it was intended to redress harm done within the province and that the extraterritorial effect was only ancillary to the main purpose.

See also
 Environment of Canada
 R. v. Thomas Equipment Ltd., [1979] 2 S.C.R. 529

References
 P. Hogg, Constitutional Law of Canada at 13.3(d).

See also
 List of Supreme Court of Canada cases

Canadian federalism case law
Supreme Court of Canada cases
1975 in Canadian case law
1975 in the environment
Canadian environmental case law
Water pollution in Canada